Darwen is a town in Lancashire, England.  It contains 33 buildings that are recorded in the National Heritage List for England as designated listed buildings.   Of these, three are listed at Grade II*, the middle grade, and the others are at Grade II, the lowest grade.  Until the coming of the Industrial Revolution, Darwen was mainly agricultural, and the older listed buildings consist of farms, churches and a cottage.  The later listed buildings vary considerably, and include more churches, and houses, memorials, bridges, a mill and its chimney, tram shelters, and the entrance to a railway tunnel.

Key

Buildings

References

Citations

Sources

Lists of listed buildings in Lancashire
Buildings and structures in Blackburn with Darwen
Listed